Vincent Oliver Norrman (born 24 December 1997) is a Swedish professional golfer who plays on the PGA Tour. He was part of the Swedish team winning the 2019 European Amateur Team Championship.

Early life
Norrman was born on Christmas Eve and grew up in Stockholm, Sweden, with his parents Eva and Claes and his sister Vendela. He has represented Haninge Golf Club through his career and been a club mate of tournament professionals and European Tour winners Alex Norén and Kristoffer Broberg.

Amateur career
He played on the Georgia Southwestern State Hurricanes golf team from 2016 to 2020 and for Florida State Seminoles in 2021, where he was named the Peach Belt Conference Men's Golf Player of the Year.

Norrman was part of the Swedish team winning the 2019 European Amateur Team Championship on home soil at Ljunghusen Golf Club in Sweden. The year after, he was again part of the Swedish team, this time at a reduced European Amateur Team Championship, with only four players in each team. Team Sweden earned the silver medal after losing in the final 2–1 against Germany, despite Norrman winning his match. On both occasions, Norrman finished tied seventh in the individual competition.

He was part of the winning International Team at the 2020 Arnold Palmer Cup held at Bay Hill Club, Florida, moved from July to December due to the COVID-19 pandemic.

His last tournament as an amateur was the first edition of the European Tour event Scandinavian Mixed, played at Vallda Golf & Country Club in Sweden, where he finished tied 12th among the men. 

His highest World Amateur Golf Ranking was 4th.

Professional career
Norrman turned professional in June 2021, became an affiliate member of the European Tour and was invited to play his first tournament as a professional at the BMW International Open at Golf Club München Eichenried in Munich, Germany, 24–27 June, where he finished tied fifth, earning €38,122. He scored a hole-in-one on a par-4 hole in the third round. A hole-in-one scored on the par-3 17th hole, would have won Norrman a car from the tournament sponsor, but he only received a bottle of champagne. It was the second hole-in-one on a par-4 on the 2021 European Tour. With his achievement in the tournament, Norrman advanced from 1,016th to 658th on the Official World Golf Ranking and qualified for next week's tournament, the Dubai Duty Free Irish Open, were he made the cut. Two weeks later, at the Cazoo Open at the Celtic Manor Resort, Wales, Norrman tied the first round lead with a 7-under-par score of 64 and finished the tournament tied 10th.

In November 2021, he finished tied second at the Korn Ferry Tour Final Stage of Q-School to secure a minimum of twelve starts for the 2022 season. In his rookie season, after finishing tied third at the Simmons Bank Open in May, he came close to securing his maiden professional title in June, trailing the winner by one stroke at the Rex Hospital Open.

In August 2022, he qualified for the 2022–23 PGA Tour season by finishing 23rd on the Korn Ferry Tour Final Eligibility Points Standing.

Personal life
On his PGA Tour profile, his girlfriend is listed as professional golfer and former world amateur number one Frida Kinhult.

Amateur wins
2018 Hurricane Invitational
2019 Hurricane Invitational, Aflac-Cougar Invitational, NSU Shark Invitational, Queens University Invitational (tied with Leo Johansson)
2020 Newberry College Invitational, Southeastern Collegiate
2021 Timuquana Collegiate

Source:

Team appearances
Amateur
European Amateur Team Championship (representing Sweden): 2019 (winners), 2020
Arnold Palmer Cup (representing the International Team): 2020 (winners)

Sources:

See also
2022 Korn Ferry Tour Finals graduates

References

External links

Swedish male golfers
PGA Tour golfers
Korn Ferry Tour graduates
Florida State Seminoles men's golfers
Georgia Southwestern State University alumni
Golfers from Stockholm
1997 births
Living people